Bangaru Panjaram is 1969 Indian Telugu-language romantic musical film directed by B. N. Reddy, and written by Palagummi Padmaraju. The soundtrack was helmed by S. Rajeswara Rao, with lyrics penned by Devulapalli Krishnasastri. The film is the last directorial of B. N. Reddy. The film received the Filmfare Award for Best Film – Telugu, and was screened at the 4th International Film Festival of India.

Plot 
Venu Gopal is an engineer who travels to various places as part of his projects. In his travel he meets a girl Neela. They both fall in love, and get married. But Venu's uncle wants him to marry his daughter. So he makes various plans and creates mis-understanding between Venu and Neela. Finally Neela leaves the house and then Venu discovers the cruelty of his uncle. He falls ill out of guiltiness. What happens next forms the rest of the story.

Cast 
 Sobhan Babu... Venu Gopal
 Vanisree... Neela
 Sriranjani

Soundtrack 
The musical score was composed by S. Rajeswara Rao and B. Gopalam.

Awards 
 Filmfare Best Film Award (Telugu) – B. N. Reddy(1969)
 The film won Nandi Award for Third Best Feature Film – Bronze (1969)

References 

1960s Telugu-language films
1965 films
Indian romantic musical films
Films directed by B. N. Reddy